McLuckie or MacLuckie is a surname. Notable people with the surname include:

George McLuckie (1931–2011), Scottish footballer
Jasper McLuckie (1878–1924), Scottish footballer
Jimmy McLuckie (1908–1986), Scottish footballer
Kirsty McLuckie, Scottish journalist
Steven McLuckie (born 1973), Australian rules footballer